Siminshahr (also Romanized as Sīmīnshahr) is a city in Gomishan District, in Torkaman County, Golestan Province, Iran. At the 2006 census its population was 13,545, in 2,762 families.

References 

Populated places in Torkaman County
Cities in Golestan Province